Mardi is a village in Kalher Mandal, Medak district of Andhra Pradesh, India. It is 150 km to the north of Hyderabad.

Geography
Mardi is located at .It has an average elevation of 442 metres (1450 feet).

Demographics
 India census, Mardi had a population of 7,000. Males constitute 50% of the population and females 50%. Mardi has an average literacy rate of 76%: male literacy is 84%, and female literacy is 67%. In Mardi, 13% of the population is under 6 years of age.

History
Mardi, a historic village originally called Mareda, later it known as Mardi also, reached its pinnacle during the Kakatiya dynasty reign.

References

Villages in Medak district